The Final Countdown Tour 1986: Live in Sweden – 20th Anniversary Edition is a DVD by the Swedish hard rock band Europe. It was released on October 4, 2006. The main feature is a concert filmed at Solnahallen in  Solna, Sweden on May 26, 1986.

Interviews, unreleased pictures from the Final Countdown tour and biography are included as bonus material.

Track listing
 "The Final Countdown" 
 "Wings of Tomorrow"
 "Ninja"
 "Carrie" 
 "On the Loose"
 Drum Solo
 "Cherokee" 
 "Time Has Come"
 "Open Your Heart"
 "Rock the Night"
 "Stormwind" 
 "Dance the Night Away"
 "The Final Countdown" (Reprise)

Bonus Features
Band interviews made in 2006.
Picture gallery with rare pictures from the tour, featuring the unreleased outtake "Where Men Won't Dare" from the Final Countdown recording sessions.
The band revisiting the studio where they recorded The Final Countdown.
Biography.

Personnel
Joey Tempest – lead vocals, acoustic guitars
John Norum – lead & rhythm guitars, backing vocals
John Levén – bass guitar
Mic Michaeli – keyboards, backing vocals
Ian Haugland – drums, backing vocals

Europe (band) video albums
2006 live albums